This is a list of awards and nominations received by Almost Famous.

Organizations

Also in 2004, the American Film Institute nominated the song "Tiny Dancer" from this film for AFI's 100 Years...100 Songs.

Guilds

Critics groups

References

External links
 

Lists of accolades by film